A Yuga Cycle ( chatur yuga, maha yuga, etc.) is a cyclic age (epoch) in Hindu cosmology. Each cycle lasts for 4,320,000 years (12,000 divine years) and repeats four yugas (world ages): Krita (Satya) Yuga, Treta Yuga, Dvapara Yuga, and Kali Yuga.

As a Yuga Cycle progresses through the four yugas, each yuga's length and humanity's general moral and physical state within each yuga decrease by one-fourth. Kali Yuga, which lasts for 432,000 years, is believed to have started in 3102 BCE. Near the end of Kali Yuga, when virtues are at their worst, a cataclysm and a re-establishment of dharma occur to usher in the next cycle's Satya Yuga, prophesied to occur by Kalki.

There are 71 Yuga Cycles in a manvantara (age of Manu) and 1,000 Yuga Cycles in a kalpa (day of Brahma).

Lexicology
A Yuga Cycle has several names.Age or Yuga:
 "Age" and "Yuga", sometimes with reverential capitalization, commonly denote a "", a cycle of four world ages, unless expressly limited by the name of one of its minor ages.

Chatur Yuga:
 A cyclic age encompassing the four yuga ages as defined in Hindu texts: Surya Siddhanta, Manusmriti, and Bhagavata Purana.

Daiva Yuga,
Deva Yuga,
Divya Yuga:
 A cyclic age of the divine, celestrial, or gods (Devas) encompassing the four yuga ages ( "human ages" or "world ages"). The Hindu texts give a length of 12,000 divine years, where a divine year lasts for 360 solar (human) years.

Maha Yuga:
 A greater cyclic age encompassing the smaller four yuga ages.

Yuga Cycle +:
 A cyclic age encompassing the four yuga ages.

It is theorized that the concept of the four yugas originated some time after the compilation of the four Vedas, but prior to the rest of the Hindu texts, based on the concept's absence in the former writings. It is believed that the four yugas—Krita (Satya), Treta, Dvapara, and Kali—are named after throws of an Indian game of long dice, marked with 4-3-2-1 respectively. A dice game is described in the Rigveda, Atharvaveda, Upanishads, Ramayana, Mahabharata, and Puranas, while the four yugas are described after the four Vedas with no mention of a correlation to dice. A complete description of the four yugas and their characteristics are in the Vishnu Smriti (ch. 20), Mahabharata (e.g. Vanaparva 149, 183), Manusmriti (I.81–86), and Puranas (e.g. Brahma, ch. 122–123; Matsya, ch. 142–143; Naradiya, Purvardha, ch. 41). The four yugas are also described in the Bhagavata Purana (3.11.18–20).

Duration and structure

Hindu texts describe four yugas (world ages) in a Yuga Cycle—Krita (Satya) Yuga, Treta Yuga, Dvapara Yuga, and Kali Yuga—where, starting in order from the first age, each yuga's length decreases by one-fourth (25%), giving proportions of 4:3:2:1. Each yuga is described as having a main period ( yuga proper) preceded by its  (dawn) and followed by its  (dusk), where each twilight (dawn/dusk) lasts for one-tenth (10%) of its main period. Lengths are given in divine years (years of the gods), each lasting for 360 solar (human) years.

Each Yuga Cycle lasts for 4,320,000 years (12,000 divine years) with its four yugas and their parts occurring in the following order:
 Krita (Satya) Yuga: 1,728,000 (4,800 divine) years
 Krita-yuga-sandhya (dawn): 144,000 (400 divine)
 Krita-yuga (proper): 1,440,000 (4,000 divine)
 Krita-yuga-sandhyamsa (dusk): 144,000 (400 divine)
 Treta Yuga: 1,296,000 (3,600 divine) years
 Treta-yuga-sandhya (dawn): 108,000 (300 divine)
 Treta-yuga (proper): 1,080,000 (3,000 divine)
 Treta-yuga-sandhyamsa (dusk): 108,000 (300 divine)
 Dvapara Yuga: 864,000 (2,400 divine) years
 Dvapara-yuga-sandhya (dawn): 72,000 (200 divine)
 Dvapara-yuga (proper): 720,000 (2,000 divine)
 Dvapara-yuga-sandhyamsa (dusk): 72,000 (200 divine)
 Kali Yuga: 432,000 (1,200 divine) years
 Kali-yuga-sandhya (dawn): 36,000 (100 divine)
 Kali-yuga (proper): 360,000 (1,000 divine)
 Kali-yuga-sandhyamsa (dusk): 36,000 (100 divine)

The current cycle's four yugas have the following dates based on Kali Yuga, the fourth and present age, starting in 3102 BCE:

Mahabharata, Book 12 (Shanti Parva), Ch. 231:

Manusmriti, Ch. 1:

Surya Siddhanta, Ch. 1:

Greater cycles

There are 71 Yuga Cycles (306,720,000 years) in a manvantara, a period ruled by Manu, who is the progenitor of mankind. There are 1,000 Yuga Cycles (4,320,000,000 years) in a kalpa, a period that is a day (12-hour day proper) of Brahma, who is the creator of the planets and first living entities. There are 14 manvantaras (4,294,080,000 years) in a kalpa with a remainder of 25,920,000 years assigned to 15 manvantara-sandhyas (junctures), each the length of a Satya Yuga (1,728,000 years). A kalpa is followed by a pralaya (night or partial dissolution) of equal length forming a full day (24-hour day). A maha-kalpa (life of Brahma) lasts for 100 360-day years of Brahma, which lasts for 72,000,000 Yuga Cycles (311.04 trillion years) and is followed by a maha-pralaya (full dissolution) of equal length.

We are currently halfway through Brahma's life (maha-kalpa):
 51st year of 100 (2nd half or parardha)
 1st month of 12
 1st kalpa (Shveta-Varaha Kalpa) of 30
 7th manvantara (Vaivasvatha Manu) of 14
 28th chatur-yuga ( Yuga Cycle) of 71
 4th yuga (Kali Yuga) of 4

Yuga dates are used in an ashloka, which is read out at the beginning of Hindu rites to specify the elapsed time in Brahma's life:

Avatars

Ganesha

Ganesha avatars are described as coming during specific yugas.

Vishnu

The Puranas describe Vishnu avatars that come during specific yugas, but may not occur in every Yuga Cycle.

Vamana appears at the beginning of Treta Yuga. According to Vayu Purana, Vamana's 3rd appearance was in the 7th Treta Yuga.

Rama appears at the end of Treta Yuga. According to Vayu Purana and Matsya Purana, Rama appeared in the 24th Yuga Cycle. According to Padma Purana, Rama also appeared in the 27th Yuga Cycle of the 6th (previous) manvantara.

Vyasa

Vyasa is attributed as the compiler of the four Vedas, Mahabharata, and Puranas. According to the Vishnu Purana, Kurma Purana, and Shiva Purana, a different Vyasa comes at the end of each Dvapara Yuga to write down veda (knowledge) to guide humans in the degraded age of Kali Yuga.

Modern theories
Breaking from the long duration of a Yuga Cycle, new theories have emerged regarding the length, number, and order of the yugas.

Sri Yukteswar Giri

Swami Sri Yukteswar Giri (1855–1936) proposed a Yuga Cycle of 24,000 years in the introduction of his book The Holy Science (1894).

He claimed the understanding that Kali Yuga lasts for 432,000 years was a mistake, which he traced back to Raja Parikshit, just after the descending Dvapara Yuga ended ( 3101BCE) and all the wise men of his court retired to the Himalaya Mountains. With no one left to correctly calculate the ages, Kali Yuga never officially started. After 499CE, in ascending Dvapara Yuga, when the intellect of men began to develop, but not fully, they noticed mistakes and attempted to correct them by converting what they thought to be divine years to human years (1:360 ratio). Yukteswar's yuga lengths for Satya, Treta, Dvapara, and Kali are respectively 4,800, 3,600, 2,400, and 1,200 "human" years (12,000 years total).

He accepted the four yugas and their 4:3:2:1 length and dharma proportions, but his Yuga Cycle contained eight yugas, the original descending set of the four yugas followed by an ascending (reversed) set, where he called each set a "Daiva Yuga" or "Electric Couple". His Yuga Cycle lasts for 24,000 years, which he believed equals one precession of the equinoxes (traditionally 25,920 years; 1,920 years ignored). He states that the world entered the Pisces-Virgo Age in 499CE ("cycle bottom"), and that the current age of ascending Dvapara Yuga started in 1699CE around the time of scientific discoveries and advancements such as electricity.

He explained that in a 24,000-year Yuga Cycle, the Sun completes one orbit around some dual star, becoming nearer and farther to a galactic center, which the pair orbit in a longer period. He called this galactic center Vishnunabhi (Vishnu's Navel), where Brahma regulates dharma or, as Yukteswar defined it, mental virtue. Dharma is lowest when farthest from Brahma at the descending-ascending intersection ("cycle-bottom"), where the opposite occurs at the "cycle-top" when nearest. At dharma's lowest (499CE), human intellect cannot comprehend anything beyond the gross material world.

Joscelyn Godwin states that Yukteswar believed the traditional chronology of the yugas wrong and rigged for political reasons, but that Yukteswar may have had political reasons of his own, evident in a police report printed in Atlantis and the Cycles of Time, which links Yukteswar to a secret anti-colonial movement called Yugantar, meaning "new age" or "transition of an epoch".

Godwin claims the Jain time cycle and the European myth of progress influenced Yukteswar, whose theory only recently became prominent outside India. Humanity in an upward cycle is contrary to traditional ideas. Godwin points out many philosophies and religions that started during a time when "man could not see beyond the gross material world" (701BCE1699CE). Only materialists and atheists would welcome the post-1700 age as an improvement.

John Major Jenkins, who adjusted ascending Kali Yuga from 499CE to 2012 in his version, criticizes Yukteswar as wanting the "cycle-bottom" to correspond to his education, beliefs, and historical understanding. Technology has thrust us deeper into material dependency and spiritual darkness.

René Guénon

René Guénon (1886–1951) proposed a Yuga Cycle of 64,800 years in his 1931 French article, which was later translated in the book Traditional Forms & Cosmic Cycles (2001).

Guénon accepted the doctrine of the four yugas, the 4:3:2:1 yuga length proportions, and Kali Yuga as the present age. He couldn't accept the extremely large lengths and felt they were encoded with additional zeros to mislead those who might use it to predict the future. He reduced a Yuga Cycle from 4,320,000 to 4,320 years (1,728 + 1,296 + 864 + 432), but he felt this was too short for humanity's history.

In looking for a multiplier, he worked backwards from the precession of the equinoxes (traditionally 25,920 years; 360 72-year degrees). Using 25,920 and 72, he calculated the sub-multiplier to be 4,320 years (72 x 60 = 4,320; 4,320 x 6 = 25,920). In noticing the "great year" of the Persians (~12,000) and Greeks (~13,000) as almost half the precession, he concluded a "great year" must be 12,960 years (4,320 x 3). In trying to find the whole number of "great years" in a manvantara or reign of Vaivasvata Manu, he found the reign of Xisuthros of the Chaldeans to be set to 64,800 years (12,960 x 5), someone he thought to be the same Manu. Guénon felt 64,800 years was a more plausible length that may line up with humanity's history. He calculated a 64,800 manvantara divided into a 4,320 "encoded" Yuga Cycle gave a multiplier of 15 (5 "great years"). Using 15 as the multiplier, he "decoded" a 5-"great year" Yuga Cycle as having the following yuga lengths:
 Satya: 25,920 (4 ratio or 2 x "great year"; 15 x 1,728)
 Treta: 19,440 (3 ratio or 1.5 x "great year"; 15 x 1,296)
 Dvapara: 12,960 (2 ratio or 1 x "great year"; 15 x 864)
 Kali: 6,480 (1 ratio or 0.5 x "great year"; 15 x 432)

Guénon did not give a start date for Kali Yuga, but instead left clues in his description of the cataclysmic destruction of the Atlantean civilization. His commentator, Jean Robin, in an early 1980s publication, claimed to have decoded this description and calculated that Kali Yuga lasted from 4481BCE to 1999CE (2000CE excluding year 0). In Les Quatre Âges de L’Humanité (The Four Ages of Humanity), a book written in 1949 by Gaston Georgel, this same end date of 1999 CE was calculated; although, in his 1983 book titled Le Cycle Judéo-Chrétien (The Judeo-Christian Cycle), he later argued to shift the cycle forward by 31 years to end in 2030 CE.

Alain Daniélou
Alain Daniélou (1907–1994) proposed a Yuga Cycle of 60,487 years in his book While the Gods Play: Shaiva Oracles and Predictions on the Cycles of History and the Destiny of Mankind (1985).

Daniélou and René Guénon had some correspondence where they both couldn't accept the extremely large lengths found in the Puranas. Daniélou mostly cited Linga Purana and his calculations are based on a 4,320,000-year Yuga Cycle containing (his calculation of 1000 ÷ 14) 71.42 manvantaras, each containing 4 yugas [4:3:2:1 proportions]. He pegged 3102BCE as the start of Kali Yuga and placed it after the dawn (yuga-sandhya). He claimed his dates are accurate to within 50 years, and that the Yuga Cycle started with a great flood and appearance of Cro-Magnon man, and will end with a catastrophe wiping out mankind.

Joscelyn Godwin found that Daniélou's misunderstanding rests solely on a bad translation of Linga Purana 1.4.7.

Hindu astronomy 
In the early texts of Hindu astronomy such as Surya Siddhanta, the length of a yuga cycle is used to specify the orbital period of heavenly bodies. Instead of specifying the period of a single orbit of a heavenly body around the Earth, the number of orbits of a heavenly body in a yuga cycle is specified.

Surya Siddhanta, Ch. 1:

The orbital period of heavenly bodies can be derived from the above numbers provided the starting point of a yuga cycle is known. According to Burgess, the Surya Siddhanta fixes the starting point of Kali Yuga as:

Based on this starting point, Ebenezer Burgess calculates the following planetary orbital periods:

Other cultures
According to Robert Bolton, there is a universal belief in many traditions that the world started in a perfect state, when nature and the supernatural were still in harmony with all things in their fullest degree of perfection possible, which was followed by an unpreventable constant deterioration of the world through the ages.

In the Works and Days (lines 109–201; 700BCE), considered the earliest European writing about human ages, the Greek poet Hesiod describes five ages (Golden, Silver, Bronze, Heroic, and Iron Ages), where the Heroic Age was added, according to Godwin, as a compromise with Greek history when the Trojan War and its heroes loomed so large. Bolton explains that the men of the Golden Age lived like gods without sorrow, toil, grief, and old age, while the men of the Iron Age ("the race of iron") never rest from labor and sorrow, are degenerated without shame, morality, and righteous indignation, and have short lives with frequent deaths at night, where even a new-born baby shows signs of old age, only to end when Zeus destroys it all.

In the Statesman, the Athenian philosopher Plato describes time as an indefinite cycle of two 36,000-year halves: (1) the world's unmaking descent into chaos and destruction; (2) the world's remaking by its creator into a renewed state. In the Cratylus (397e), Plato recounts the golden race of men who came first, who were noble and good daemons (godlike guides) upon the earth.

In the Metamorphoses (I, 89–150; 8BCE), the Roman poet Ovid describes four ages (Golden, Silver, Bronze, and Iron Ages), excluding Hesiod's Heroic Age, as a downward curve with the present time as the nadir of misery and immorality, according to Godwin, affecting both human life and the after-death state, where deaths in the first two ages became immortal, watchful spirits that benefited the human race, deaths in the third age went to Hades (Greek god of the underworld), and deaths in the fourth age had an unknown fate.

Joscelyn Godwin posits that it is probably from Hindu tradition that knowledge of the ages reached the Greeks and other Indo-European peoples. Godwin adds that the number 432,000 (Kali Yuga's duration) occurring in four widely separated cultures (Hindu, Chaldean, Chinese, and Icelandic) has long been noticed.

See also

 Hindu eschatology
 Hindu units of time
 Kalpa (day of Brahma)
 Manvantara (age of Manu)
 Pralaya (period of dissolution)
 Yuga Cycle (four yuga ages): Satya (Krita), Treta, Dvapara, and Kali
 Itihasa (Hindu Tradition)
 List of numbers in Hindu scriptures
 Vedic-Puranic chronology

Notes

References

Four Yugas
Hindu astronomy
Hindu philosophical concepts
Time in Hinduism
Units of time